Visa requirements for Kyrgyz citizens are administrative entry restrictions by the authorities of other states placed on citizens of Kyrgyzstan. As of 2 July 2019, Kyrgyz citizens had visa-free or visa on arrival access to 62 countries and territories, ranking the Kyrgyz passport 82nd in terms of travel freedom according to the Henley Passport Index.

Visa requirements map

Changes 
Visa requirements for Kyrgyz citizens were lifted by Philippines (15 April 2014), Indonesia (September 2015) and Serbia (8 November 2018).

Following countries have reinstated visa requirements for Kyrgyz citizens: Estonia (1 July 1992), Latvia (1993), Lithuania (1 November 1993), Slovakia (6 May 1994), Hungary (1 December 1997), Bulgaria (1 January 1999), Turkmenistan (19 June 1999), Romania (1 July 2000),  Czech Republic (22 October 2000) and Poland (3 November 2000).

Visa requirements

Dependent, Disputed, or Restricted territories
Unrecognized or partially recognized countries

Dependent and autonomous territories

See also 

Visa policy of Kyrgyzstan
Kyrgyzstani passport

References and Notes
References

Notes

Kyrgyzstani
Foreign relations of Kyrgyzstan